Caherline GAA (Irish: Cathair Laighin) is a Gaelic Athletic Association club based in County Limerick, Ireland.

History
The club was founded in 1884, making it one of the oldest clubs in county Limerick. The early years of the club were its most successful, winning the Limerick Senior Hurling Championship on three occasions; 1896, 1905 and 1907. Caherline also lost four county finals in this period; 1889, 1898 (when a lack of crowd control caused the match to be abandoned), 1908 and 1916.

By the 1920s Caherline had slipped back to the junior ranks but returned to the limelight in 1927 when winning their first Limerick Junior Hurling Championship by beating Kilmallock in the county final. This was followed by a second junior title in 1931, when once again Kilmallock were beaten in the final.

The club went through lean times after this and were not to appear in another county final until 1974 when Glenroe were the victors in the county junior hurling final. Defeat was to be Caherline's lot once again in the 2001 county junior hurling final, losing out to Newcastle West. These defeats were consigned to history however, when in 2007 Caherline bridged a 76-year gap and claimed their third junior hurling championship title defeating Effin on a 3-12 to 1-9 score line in the county final.

In 2008 the club played in the Limerick Intermediate Hurling Championship for the first time and exceeded expectations by reaching the county final. However Bruff were to be the victors on this occasion, winning on a score line of 3-14 to 0-15 in Ballyagran on 12 October 2008.

By 2016 Caherline were back in the junior ranks but in that year they enjoyed a long season in Limerick junior hurling championship. Following a competitive east championship, the club were crowned east junior hurling champions for the first time since 2007 with a 0-14 to 0-11 win over Ballybricken-Bohermore. Had someone told you that Caherline would go on to compete in a further four championship matches that year, one may have believed Caherline were destined for county honours. However, despite disposing of Castletown-Ballyagran with ease in the county quarter finals, the club eventually lost out after a trilogy of games against St. Patrick's in the semi finals. These games had everything; last gasp equalisers, extra time, abandonments, red cards over-turned, hard-fought comebacks. Eventually, Caherline lost out AET in the second replay on a 1-23 to 3-14 score line on 22 October 2016.

Caherline won their fourth Limerick junior hurling title in 2021. They progressed from their group of six teams, divisional championships no longer formed part of the county championship after a restructure in 2020, to reach the county quarter finals. In their quarter final, Caherline had a victory over Ballybrown and this was followed by a semi final win over St. Patrick's. St. Kieran's were the opposition in the final, with Caherline winning on a score line of 1-13 to 0-10 in Kilmallock on 13 November 2021.

Honours
Hurling
 Limerick Senior Hurling Championship: 3
1896, 1905, 1907
 Limerick Junior Hurling Championship: 4
1927, 1931, 2007, 2021
 Limerick Under 21 B Hurling Championship: 1
 1990
 Limerick Minor B Hurling Championship: 1
2004
 East Limerick Junior Hurling Championship: 13
1971, 1974, 1992, 1997, 2000, 2001, 2002, 2004, 2005, 2006, 2007, 2016, 2019
 East Limerick Intermediate Hurling Championship: 2
2013, 2018
 East Limerick Under 21 Hurling Championship: 1
1965
 East Limerick Under 21 B Hurling Championship: 8
1990, 1993, 2000, 2002, 2004, 2005, 2007, 2008
 East Limerick Minor Hurling Championship: 1
1997
 East/City-East Limerick Minor B Hurling Championship: 6
1989, 1991, 1999, 2004, 2005, 2018

Football
 East Limerick Under 21 Football Championship: 1
1965
 East Limerick Minor Football Championship: 2
1961, 1963

Notable players
 Jim Flood

References

Gaelic games clubs in County Limerick
Hurling clubs in County Limerick